Chen Meng-hsiu (born 21 November 1975) or Cirasmita Chen is a Taiwanese lawyer and politician.

Chen was a human rights lawyer prior to her career in politics. She was appointed Chen Hui-min's successor as secretary-general of the New Power Party on 1 March 2019, when party chairman Chiu Hsien-chih took office. As secretary-general, Chen Meng-hsiu announced the party's electoral strategy for the 2020 legislative election. When Chiu resigned from the chairmanship on 12 August 2019, Chen managed party affairs while the position was vacant. Hsu Yung-ming, Chiu's successor as New Power Party chair, announced on 30 August 2019 that  would replace Chen as secretary-general.

References

1975 births
Living people
Taiwanese women lawyers
Human rights lawyers
21st-century Taiwanese lawyers
21st-century Taiwanese women politicians
21st-century Taiwanese politicians
21st-century women lawyers